Eucereon pilatii is a moth of the subfamily Arctiinae. It was described by Francis Walker in 1854. It is found in Mexico, Guatemala, Honduras and Suriname.

References

 

pilatii
Moths described in 1854